Potassium tetraphenylborate is the salt with the formula KB(C6H5)4).  It is a colourless salt that is a rare example of a water-insoluble salt of potassium.

The salt has a low solubility in water of only 1.8×10−4 g/L.  It is, however, soluble in organic solvents. The insolubility of this compound has been used to determine the concentration of potassium ions by precipitation and gravimetric analysis:

 K+  +  NaB(Ph)4   →   KB(Ph)4  +  Na+

The compound adopts a polymeric structure with bonds between the phenyl rings and potassium.  As such it is classified as an organopotassium compound.

References

External links 
 Potassium tetraphenylborate Jmol Page

Potassium compounds
Tetraphenylborates